Whitesburg is a home rule-class city in and the county seat of Letcher County, Kentucky, United States. The population was 2,139 at the 2010 census and an estimated 1,875 in 2018. It was named for C. White, a state politician.

Geography

Kentucky Route 15 passes through the city, leading northwest  to Hazard. It has its eastern terminus in the east part of Whitesburg at U.S. Route 119. US 119 leads northeast  to U.S. Route 23 at Jenkins and southwest over Pine Mountain  to Cumberland.

Climate
Whitesburg is located within a climatic transition zone between the humid subtropical climate and the humid continental climate zones. Summers are hot, humid and wet. Winters are generally cool to cold, with occasional snowfall.

Demographics

According to the census of 2000, there were 1,600 people, 642 households, and 412 families residing in the city. The racial makeup of the city was 96.19% White, 0.62% African American, 2.62% Asian, 0.06% from other races, and 0.50% from two or more races. Hispanic or Latino of any race were 0.56% of the population.

There were 642 households, out of which 27.1% had children under the age of 18 living with them, 48.6% were married couples living together, 12.8% had a female householder with no husband present, and 35.8% were non-families. 34.3% of all households were made up of individuals, and 15.1% had someone living alone who was 65 years of age or older. The average household size was 2.21 and the average family size was 2.82.

In the city the population was spread out, with 18.6% under the age of 18, 7.8% from 18 to 24, 24.2% from 25 to 44, 25.4% from 45 to 64, and 24.1% who were 65 years of age or older. The median age was 45 years. For every 100 females, there were 79.0 males. For every 100 females age 18 and over, there were 76.1 males.

As a result of a survey taken subsequent to the census it was established that the city's population was made up of 3,100 residents.  1,241 households were left out of the census because neither the residents of Whitesburg's Housing Project nor residents of the Letcher Manor Nursing Home were counted in the census.  When these facilities are included in the population count the number of city residents climbs to 3,100.

The median income for a household in the city was $28,750, and the median income for a family was $35,714. Males had a median income of $31,339 versus $25,478 for females. The per capita income for the city was $20,202. About 22.0% of families and 23.1% of the population were below the poverty line, including 27.2% of those under age 18 and 13.9% of those age 65 or over.

Education
Whitesburg has a lending library, a branch of the Letcher County Library.

Media
Whitesburg's major newspaper is The Mountain Eagle. Founded by Nehemiah Webb in 1907, the weekly paper has been owned by the Gish family of Letcher County since 1956. The Eagle has won numerous awards for its coverage of strip mining and its environmental effects, as well as education, and political corruption.

Whitesburg's oldest continuously operating radio station, WTCW-AM/WXKQ-FM, is located  outside the city near the community of Mayking. The license holder is T.C.W. Broadcasting, Inc. and is one of 18 radio stations owned and operated by Forcht Broadcasting, a Forcht Group of Kentucky company. The public radio station licensed for Whitesburg, WMMT, is located at Appalshop in downtown Whitesburg.

Arts and culture

Whitesburg is the home of Appalshop, a nonprofit aimed at helping people tell stories and educate others about Appalachia. 

 Country Music Highway Road Rally - This antique car rally begins at Greenup, Kentucky, traverses the length of U.S. 23 in Kentucky, and ends at Whitesburg. Held during the peak color season in October, the rally draws sightseers from around the nation. Every county along the route is the home of at least one country music artist.
 Cowan Creek Mountain Music School - A set of week-long intensive classes in banjo, guitar, fiddle, square dance, storytelling and singing. The school is held in late June at the community of Cowan and in Whitesburg. It is open to children and adults.
 Letcher County Marching Invitational - On the last Saturday of October, the Letcher County Central High School Marching Band hosts a day of competition for marching bands from southeast Kentucky, southwest Virginia, and northeast Tennessee. The contest has brought in groups from five states.
 Seedtime on the Cumberland - Festival of arts and crafts held annually in early June. The festival is centered at Appalshop and focuses on traditional music, art and crafts. It includes old-time music concerts and jam sessions.
 Whitesburg's July 4th Celebration is a free event held on the Fourth of July at Parkway Plaza shopping center. The event includes free music, entertainment, fireworks and fun.
 Riverside Days, formally Jenkins Days, is a three-day event held at Riverside Park in Whitesburg, next to the hospital. The festival includes country headliners, sponsored by Jenkins Festival Committee, Inc. and Coca-Cola; Mountain Outreach Idol; local performers; bluegrass; Gospel; Rock; Country; food and craft booths; rides; a mechanical bull; bungee jump; prizes and fun. 
 Whitesburg Labor Day Celebration, a one-day festival held in Riverside Park on Labor Day Monday. It features food, as well as free music, entertainment and inflatables for children.
 The Heritage 2KX Car Show, a custom and antique car show held annually in early September. The event attracts hundreds of show cars from around the region, and features a police-escorted drag through Whitesburg.
 The Mountain Heritage Festival - Fall festival held annually the last weekend of September. The festival features talent shows, concerts, arts and crafts, food booths, a parade, and window display competition.

Notable people
 Harry M. Caudill, author, historian, professor, lawyer, legislator, and environmentalist, 1922–1990
 Jessamyn Duke, Former martial arts fighter and professional wrestler signed under WWE on the Nxt brand
 Emery L. Frazier, mayor, state representative, Chief Clerk of the U.S. Senate, Secretary of the U.S. Senate, 1896–1973
 Tom Gish, publisher of The Mountain Eagle
 Goebel Ritter, player for the New York Knicks (1948–1951), and assistant superintendent of Whitesburg schools
 Lee Sexton, traditional Appalachian banjo musician
 Robb Webb, voice artist

References

External links
 City of Whitesburg official website
 Letcher County Public Schools
 The Kentuckian News (Letcher County Edition) 
 The Mountain Eagle 

Cities in Letcher County, Kentucky
County seats in Kentucky
Appalachian culture in Kentucky
Cities in Kentucky